Mathilde Doutreluingne is a French track racing cyclist.

As a junior, she won two bronze medals at the Junior Track Cycling World Championships in the Sprint and the 500 m time trial in 2000. In 2002, she won the European Championships (under-23) in the scratch. In all sprint and 500 m time trial races at the French National Track Championships in 2001, 2002 and 2003 races she finished third.

References

External links

1982 births
Living people
French track cyclists
French female cyclists
Place of birth missing (living people)